Procopio Franco Hernández (born 8 July 1970 in Mexico City) is a Mexican former long-distance runner who competed in the 2004 Summer Olympics and in the 2008 Summer Olympics.

Achievements

References

1970 births
Living people
Mexican male long-distance runners
Athletes from Mexico City
Olympic athletes of Mexico
Athletes (track and field) at the 2004 Summer Olympics
Athletes (track and field) at the 2008 Summer Olympics
Pan American Games medalists in athletics (track and field)
Pan American Games bronze medalists for Mexico
Central American and Caribbean Games gold medalists for Mexico
Athletes (track and field) at the 2007 Pan American Games
Competitors at the 2002 Central American and Caribbean Games
Competitors at the 2006 Central American and Caribbean Games
Central American and Caribbean Games medalists in athletics
Medalists at the 2007 Pan American Games
21st-century Mexican people